Economic citizenship can be used to represent both the economic contributions requisite to become a citizen as well as the role in which one's economic standing can influence his or her rights as a citizen. The relationship between economic participation and citizenship can be considered a contributing factor to increasing inequalities and unequal representation of different socioeconomic classes within a country.

Republican notions of citizenship 
The republican model of citizenship emphasizes one’s active participation in civil society as a means of defining his or her citizenship.  Initially used to describe citizenship in ancient Greece, the republican notion focuses on how political participation is linked with one’s indent as a citizen, stemming from Aristotle’s definition of citizenship as the ability to rule and be ruled.

In relation to economic citizenship, the civil participation discussed by Aristotle can be described as economic participation so critical to the capitalist system. Defining one’s ability to be a full citizenship by his or her economic participation will establish a variegated system of citizenship in which those who can contribute most to the economy will be better represented and have a broader range of rights than those who cannot contribute as much. Variegated citizenship represents the concept that those within a different regime or status receive different levels of rights and privileges.

Economic citizenship in theory 
T. H. Marshall acknowledges this concept in his discussion on the relationships between social class, capitalism and citizenship. He argues that capitalism is reliant upon social classes which directly relates to differentiated concepts of citizenship.

Similarly, Alice Kessler-Harris discusses the relationship between one’s ability to labor, and his or her right to equal wages as a component of citizenship. Her central argument addresses how denying a woman the right to labor and equal wages limits her identity as a citizen.

The arguments by both of these theorists contribute to the notion of economic citizenship because they highlight both how economic standing and participation can be linked to one’s identity and privileges as a citizen.

Citizenship by investment 

Citizenship-by-investment enables individuals to acquire an additional citizenship by making an exceptional economic contribution to another country. This can be done by successfully completing a citizenship-by-investment program (also referred to as immigrant investor programs). Most of these programs are structured to ensure that the investment contributes to the welfare, advancement and economic development of the country in which they wish to reside or belong to. It is more about making an economic contribution rather than an investment. These programs must be run in a manner which is legal and transparent, and in keeping with the constitution of the nation offering citizenship. This ideally should prevent corruption at the same time as giving the individual obtaining citizenship a sound legal right to their new citizenship.

Immigration and citizenship law specialist Christian Kälin created the term ius doni to describe this type of citizenship by analogy with the terms ius sanguinis and ius soli.   Kälin's analysis of the subject points out the increasing popularity of this method to attract high-value investors around the world.

Several countries are currently offering investors citizenship or residence in return for an economic investment. This is usually in the form of requiring a substantial investment, coupled with compliance, residence and language requirements, among others. These countries are very selective in the type of individual they will allow to gain citizenship, however these individuals are more often than not motivated by more than just capital gains, and are looking to invest in a country more substantially from a family, social or cultural perspective. Individuals who bring their family with them as dependents commonly contribute to the economy in a variety of ways, including paying for private schooling, purchasing real estate, extending their business and creating employment. Previously, the majority of countries with citizenship-by-investment programs were located in the Caribbean, for example Antigua and Barbuda, Saint Kitts and Nevis and Dominica. More recently in the European Union, Malta and Cyprus have developed successful programs. It is estimated that each year, hundreds of wealthy people spend a collective $2 billion to add a second or third passport to their collection. It is estimated that in 2018, €100.6 million came in to Cyprus in revenues from the Cyprus citizenship by investment program.

Alternatively, countries may offer certain options to secure a permanent residence. Examples of countries offering such residence programs are the United Kingdom, Switzerland, Portugal, Bulgaria, Canada and Australia.

Economic impact 
The economic impact of citizenship by investment programs is mainly a function of the monetary inflows as well as how such programs operate. The primary impact is generally achieved through an investment in the real estate sector of a country, which in turn can significantly boost local economies. In aggregate, this effect can be particularly strong for smaller economies.

The economic effect on smaller states can be illustrated when looking at GDP growth rates over time in Caribbean states for instance. The impact of such programs on a country’s economy is significant and can range from 5.1% to 14%.

Possible advantages of citizenship-by-investment 
 Better quality of life — Citizenship-by-investment programs often provide individuals with the ability to relocate permanently to another country to improve many aspects of lifestyle
 Mobility — A second, or even third, passport from a country with a high level of visa-free access gives an individual the ability to travel widely without time-consuming visa application processes
 Security — Securing the option to permanently reside or retire in a safe country. This alternative passport, most likely from a peaceful country, is critical when travelling and in times of political unrest, civil war, terrorism and other situations
 Education — Provide your children with the ability to live, work, and study in multiple countries
 Financial planning — An alternative citizenship offers more privacy and economic security across banking and investment portfolios. Investors also enjoy tax breaks and the possibility of improved personal and corporate tax exposure

Possible disadvantages of citizenship-by-investment 
 The time it takes to complete the process differs between countries and programs, and this can also be delayed by the time it takes the applicant to submit all the necessary documentation, which differs from country to country. For example, the time to citizenship for Cyprus is as little as 90 days, while Malta and Antigua and Barbuda take between three and six months. To qualify for citizenship in Canada, the applicant has to be physically present for an aggregate of four years in a six-year period.
 The level of investment required also varies between countries and programs. For example, Caribbean citizenship-by-investment programs require less of an investment than those programs in the EU. In Dominica the minimum investment required is USD $200,000 and St. Kitts and Nevis the minimum investment required is USD $200,000 in real estate
 Governments may change their policies or requirements at any time, or increase the investment amount without much notice. Applicants who have already submitted their documents may have to make the necessary changes to still qualify for the programs
 Generally, citizenship-by-investment programs have come under much scrutiny over the years, over concerns over a lack of transparency and accountability
 Certain governments may limit or prohibit the use of dual-citizenship

List of citizenships by investment

Current citizenships by investment 
Current citizenship by investment programs include Malta (2014-), Saint Kitts and Nevis (1984-), Dominica (1993-), Antigua and Barbuda (2013-), Grenada (1997-2001, 2013- or 2015-), Vanuatu (1996-1997 or 1998-2002, 2014-), Turkey (2016-), North Macedonia, Bulgaria, Saint Lucia (2016-), Cambodia, Samoa (1991-1997, 2017-), Cape Verde, Austria, Jordan (2018-) and Egypt (2020-).

Former citizenships by investment
Former citizenship by investment programs include Scotland (18th century), Belize (1985-2001 or 2002), Ireland (1984-1994 or 1988-1998), Moldova (2018-2019), Cyprus (2007 or 2011-2020), Montenegro (2008-2010, 2015-2022), Comoros (2008-2018), Marshall Islands (1995-1996), Nauru (1998-2000 or 2002) and Tonga (1982-1996).

See also

 Visa requirements for Maltese citizens
 Visa requirements for Saint Kitts and Nevis citizens
 Visa requirements for Dominica citizens
 Visa requirements for Antigua and Barbuda citizens
 Visa requirements for Grenadian citizens
 Visa requirements for Vanuatuan citizens
 Visa requirements for Turkish citizens
 Visa requirements for North Macedonian citizens
 Visa requirements for Bulgarian citizens
 Visa requirements for Saint Lucian citizens
 Visa requirements for Cambodian citizens
 Visa requirements for Samoan citizens
 Visa requirements for Cape Verdean citizens
 Visa requirements for Austrian citizens
 Visa requirements for Jordanian citizens
 Visa requirements for Egyptian citizens

References 

Citizenship
Political concepts
Economic inequality